Mintho compressa is a European species of fly in the family Tachinidae.

References

Tachininae
Diptera of Europe
Diptera of Africa
Diptera of Asia
Taxa named by Johan Christian Fabricius
Insects described in 1787